The 2010 Vancouver Whitecaps FC season was the club's 35th year of existence, as well as their 24th and final year as a second-tier club. Following the end of the season, the Whitecaps FC joined MLS, becoming the second Canadian club to enter the league.

Schedule and results

Pre-season

USSF Division 2 Professional League

Post-season

Nutrilite Canadian Championship

Conference table

Current roster
as of the end of the season.

Starting 11
Last updated on 17 October 2010.
(These are the most used starting active players in the most used formation throughout the complete season)

Transactions
(As of End of 2009 season to Present)
October 2009
OUT

November 2009
IN

OUT

December 2009
IN

January 2010
IN

OUT

February 2010
IN

OUT

April 2010
IN

June 2010
IN

OUT

July 2010
IN

OUT

August 2010
IN

OUT

September 2010
OUT

References

Vancouver Whitecaps (1986–2010) seasons
Vancouver Whitecaps
USSF Division 2 Professional League